Maureen Riscoe (25 July 1921 - 26 November 2003) was a British actress and casting director.

She was the born in London on 25 July 1921, the only daughter of fellow actor Arthur Riscoe and his wife Olive Raymond.

Riscoe died on 26 November 2003 in Uxbridge, London.

Selected radio
 Much-Binding-in-the-Marsh (1944 to 1954)

Selected filmography
 Old Mother Riley's New Venture as Mabel (1949)
 A Matter of Murder as Julie McKelvin (1949)

References

External links

1921 births
2003 deaths
British actresses
British casting directors
Women casting directors